Kamp Koral: SpongeBob's Under Years (also known simply as Kamp Koral) is an American computer-animated television series created by Stephen Hillenburg and developed by Luke Brookshier, Marc Ceccarelli, Andrew Goodman, Kaz, Mr. Lawrence, and Vincent Waller that premiered on Paramount+ on March 4, 2021. The series is a prequel and spinoff of Nickelodeon's SpongeBob SquarePants, featuring younger versions of the characters as they attend a summer camp. In August 2021, the series was renewed for a 13-episode second season.

Premise 
The series follows 10-year-old SpongeBob SquarePants as he spends his summer at a sleepaway camp called Kamp Koral. The camp is run by Mr. Krabs, a single father raising his baby daughter, Pearl. The camp's activities are overseen by Mrs. Puff, who works as the scoutmaster and arts-and-crafts teacher. SpongeBob bunks in a cabin with his friends Patrick Star and Sandy Cheeks. Their cabin is run by Squidward Tentacles, a pessimistic camper who is slightly older than the others (almost a teenager) and is a junior counselor. Unbeknownst to the campers, the Krusty Kanteen's chef Plankton runs a secret laboratory underneath the camp where his computer assistant Karen helps him create elaborate inventions to take over the world. Episodes focus on SpongeBob and his friends learning more about the campsite, exploring new places, and taking part in summertime activities.

Characters 

 SpongeBob SquarePants (voiced by Tom Kenny) - A camper at Kamp Koral.
 Patrick Star (voiced by Bill Fagerbakke) - A camper at Kamp Koral and SpongeBob's best friend.
 Squidward Tentacles (voiced by Rodger Bumpass) - A junior camp counselor.
 Mr. Krabs (voiced by Clancy Brown) - The proprietor of Kamp Koral.
 Sandy Cheeks (voiced by Carolyn Lawrence) - A camper at Kamp Koral. In this show, she is shown to have braces.
 Sheldon Plankton (voiced by Mr. Lawrence) - A chef at the camp's Krusty Kanteen.
 Mrs. Puff (voiced by Mary Jo Catlett) - The activities director at Kamp Koral.
 Karen Plankton (voiced by Jill Talley) - Plankton's computer assistant.
 Pearl Krabs (voiced by Lori Alan) - Mr. Krabs' baby daughter.
 Nobby and Narlene (voiced by Carlos Alazraqui and Kate Higgins respectively) - Two hillbilly narwhals that live near Kamp Koral.

Release 
The series was originally planned to premiere on Nickelodeon in July 2020, but on July 30, 2020, it was announced that the series would instead be released on CBS All Access, the ViacomCBS streaming service, in early 2021. It was later announced that the series will be airing on Nickelodeon as well later in the year. On January 28, 2021, it was announced that the first six episodes would release along with The SpongeBob Movie: Sponge on the Run on March 4, 2021 with the launch of Paramount+. The series also began airing on Nickelodeon on April 2, 2021. On June 24, 2021, it was announced that new episodes would release on Paramount+ on July 22, 2021.

On July 21, 2022, a "SpongeBob Universe" crossover special was announced, featuring the main series and spinoffs Kamp Koral and The Patrick Star Show. "The Tidal Zone", a spoof of The Twilight Zone, was originally set to premiere on Nickelodeon on November 25, 2022, before getting delayed and rescheduled for release on January 13, 2023. Alongside this, it was announced that new episodes of Kamp Koral would release on Paramount+ on September 30, 2022.

Production

Development
SpongeBob SquarePants creator Stephen Hillenburg died on November 26, 2018. Animator/producer Paul Tibbitt — who worked on SpongeBob SquarePants between 1999 and 2018 and served as showrunner between 2005 and 2015 — remarked, "In the animation business, you know, there always used to be the sort of joke... When you run out of ideas, you just do Muppet Babies. Steve [Hillenburg] would always say to me, 'You know, one of these days, they’re going to want to make SpongeBob Babies. That’s when I'm out of here.'"

According to Vincent Waller, the idea for Kamp Koral originated in flashback scenes from The SpongeBob Movie: Sponge on the Run (2020). Having worked on the original show for years, Waller calculated the hierarchy of the camp and the ages of the characters (albeit, younger). Marc Ceccarelli helped develop the new characters and new locations. In October 2018, on one of Brian Robbins' first days as the president of Nickelodeon, he "decided to put a room together and really look at what the SpongeBob universe looks like." According to Robbins, "out of that came the Kamp Koral idea and actually a couple of other ideas."

Announcement
On February 14, 2019, it was announced that an unnamed spinoff of SpongeBob SquarePants was in the works at Nickelodeon. On June 4, 2019, it was announced that a CG-animated spinoff of SpongeBob SquarePants under the working title of Kamp Koral was officially green-lit with an initial order of 13 episodes. In response to news of the series, Paul Tibbitt criticized its announcement Twitter the next day, stating, "I do not mean any disrespect to my colleagues who are working on this show. They are good people and talented artists. But this is some greedy, lazy executive-ing right here, and they ALL know full well Steve [Hillenburg] would have HATED this. Shame on them."

On February 19, 2020, the show was officially titled as Kamp Koral: SpongeBob's Under Years. It was also announced that the voice cast from SpongeBob SquarePants would return for the spinoff series. A sneak peek of the series aired during the Bears-Saints NFL wildcard game on January 10, 2021 on Nickelodeon.

On March 4, 2021, it was announced that an additional 13 episodes had been ordered, bringing the series total to 26 episodes. On August 11, 2021, the series was renewed for a second season of 13 episodes.

Episodes

Reception

Allie Leatherman of Legacy Press felt that the series overplays the slapstick for comedic purposes that children would not find funny. She also argues that, "The shadows are extremely harsh, the color palette is ugly, and the backgrounds are boring and lifeless. The animation makes it unclear if it even takes place underwater. The character design is alright other than Patrick, who just looks like pink mush in the shape of a star." 

Jessica Curney of The Michigan Daily felt that the series is not needed and unnecessary for the franchise and that it does not have the same "spark" as the first three seasons of the original show. 

Mikel J. Davies of The Harvard Crimson wrote that the show "seems to fall short of becoming a beloved classic like its predecessor" and that its comedy is "shallow and unremarkable, much unlike the original show", but praised the decision to keep the original show's main cast of characters and their voice actors, and remarked that "in general, Kamp Koral is an entertaining and enjoyable show", and that "there is hope as the show continues", as "some of the episodes had that familiar spark of creativity".

Home media

References

Notes

External links 
 
 

SpongeBob SquarePants
2021 American television series debuts
2020s American animated television series
American animated television spin-offs
American children's animated comedy television series
American computer-animated television series
American prequel television series
English-language television shows
Nicktoons
Paramount+ original programming
Animated television series about children
Television series about summer camps
Child versions of cartoon characters
Paramount+ children's programming